Rolando Quintanilla (born September 17, 1977) is a Mexican former racing driver from Nuevo Laredo.

After a youth in motocross and amateur racing in SCCA Formula Continental and Formula Ford 2000, Quintanilla made his Indy Lights debut in 1999 for Conquest Racing. He competed full-time in 2000 for the same team and finished 16th in points. He switched teams to his own Roquin Motorsports/Escuderia Telmex in 2001 and moved up to 10th in points in the series' final year of operation. He took Roquin to the Infiniti Pro Series (now called Indy Lights) in 2002 and finished 11th. He made 2 IPS starts in 2003 and returned full-time in 2004 and finished a career best 7th in points. In the combined Indy Lights series he had 42 starts with a best finish of 3rd in 2004 at Kansas Speedway and a best CART Indy Lights finish of 4th in 2001 at Texas Motor Speedway. During his career Quintanilla also tested for numerous teams in the CART and Indycar series logging miles for chassis and tire development.

Quintanilla resided in Calabasas, California and attended Pepperdine University.

References

External links
Indy Lights results at ChampCarStats.com

1977 births
Mexican racing drivers
Indy Lights drivers
Living people

Conquest Racing drivers